Luther Swift Dixon (June 17, 1825 – December 6, 1891) was an American lawyer and judge, and was the 4th Chief Justice of the Wisconsin Supreme Court.

Early life and career

Dixon was born in Milton, Vermont, the son of Luther and Sarah (Seeger) Dixon. After obtaining a common school education, he studied law under Luke P. Poland, a judge on the Supreme Court of Vermont, who would later represent Vermont as a United States Senator and Congressman.  Dixon was admitted to the bar in 1850.

In 1850, Dixon traveled to Wisconsin and settled in Portage, in Columbia County, and started a legal practice.  In 1851, Dixon was elected District Attorney of Columbia County, for a two-year term commencing January 1, 1852.  He was re-elected for a two-year term in 1854.

State of Wisconsin vs. John B. DuBay

In the year after his term as District Attorney expired, Dixon earned wide recognition for his prosecution of John Baptiste DuBay in his murder trial.  DuBay had been involved in a property dispute with William Reynolds, and killed him after a confrontation.  DuBay was a prominent character in the Wisconsin Territory and the early years of statehood.  He was a celebrated pioneer character, connected to the American Fur Company, which was one of the most powerful businesses in the Wisconsin Territory.  He was part French Canadian, part Menominee Indian, and served as an interpreter for many important negotiations with Wisconsin's Native American communities.

DuBay's attorneys were both esteemed lawyers and prominent politicians—Moses M. Strong had been Speaker of the Wisconsin Assembly, and had famously secured the acquittal of James Russell Vineyard after he had killed a fellow representative on the floor of the territorial legislature; Harlow S. Orton had been an attorney for Governor Coles Bashford when he successfully challenged the results of the 1855 Wisconsin gubernatorial election.  The judge in the case, Wisconsin Circuit Court Judge Alexander L. Collins, gave wide deference to the defense to bring in a number of prominent Wisconsin pioneers and statesmen to testify to the character of the defendant.

DuBay was ultimately acquitted, but Dixon's reputation was secure.  Within a year, he would take the place of the judge who had presided over the case, and within two years he would be Chief Justice of the Wisconsin Supreme Court.  Dixon later summarized that the real defendant in the trial was the "pioneer spirit," and that DuBay's crimes went unpunished due to a parade of prominent Wisconsin pioneer character witnesses, which muddied the facts of the crime.

Wisconsin judiciary

In 1858, Alexander Collins resigned his seat as Judge of the 9th Circuit.  The new Governor, Alexander Randall, appointed Dixon to the seat, which had jurisdiction over Columbia, Dane, Jefferson, and Sauk counties.

Less than a year later, in April 1859, Chief Justice Edward V. Whiton died suddenly.  Governor Randall again turned to Dixon, naming him Chief Justice of the Wisconsin Supreme Court at the age of 33.

Only months after his appointment as Chief Justice, Dixon ran into controversy when he dissented from the majority of the court which had voted to ignore the ruling of the United States Supreme Court in the case of Ableman v. Booth.  The Wisconsin Supreme Court had previously ruled that the federal Fugitive Slave Act of 1850 was unconstitutional, a position which was popular with the ascendant abolitionist Republican party in Wisconsin.  The Supreme Court overruled the Wisconsin Court, ruling that state courts could not annul federal laws.  Dixon wrote in favor of accepting the decision of the U.S. Supreme Court, stating that while he personally believed the Fugitive Slave Act was unconstitutional, he agreed with the federal court's interpretation of their jurisdiction.

His dissent resulted in him losing the support of the Republican Party for his re-election in 1860.  Nevertheless, he was able to obtain re-election as an independent.  And was re-elected two more times after that.

Dixon resigned from the court in 1874 to return to private legal practice.  He distinguished himself again in this phase, representing the State of Wisconsin in upholding the constitutionality of the state's railroad regulation "Granger" laws.

Family and personal life
Luther Dixon married Mary Eliza Woods.  They had five children together, though only four survived to adulthood.

Dixon suffered from asthma and moved to Denver, Colorado, in 1881 for the health benefits, although he maintained a home in Wisconsin as well.  He died in 1891 while visiting Milwaukee on his way back from a trip to Washington, D.C.

References

People from Milton, Vermont
People from Portage, Wisconsin
Lawyers from Milwaukee
Chief Justices of the Wisconsin Supreme Court
Wisconsin lawyers
1825 births
1891 deaths
19th-century American judges
19th-century American lawyers